Moroccans and people of Moroccan descent, who come from various ethnic groups, form a distinct community in Belgium and part of the wider Moroccan diaspora. They represent the largest non-European immigrant population in Belgium and are widely referred to as Belgo-Marocains in French and Belgische Marokkanen in Dutch.

History

There has been a Moroccan presence in Belgium since 1912 when France began recruiting workers from its North African colonies as immigrant workers, allowing some to cross into Belgium. At the time, Morocco possessed a largely agrarian economy and labour migration was attractive to many young men. There were thought to be 6,000 Moroccans living in Belgium by 1930, predominantly in industrial towns in Wallonia.

The rapid recovery of the Belgian economy after World War II was based on the rapid revival of coal mining and heavy industry which experienced an acute labour shortage. As a response, the Belgian government entered into various guest worker programmes aimed at encouraging workers to travel to Belgium on work contracts. The first such agreement was made with Italy in 1946 but the arrangement collapsed after large-scale loss of life among Italian workers in the Marcinelle mining disaster in 1956. Alternative agreements were concluded with Spain (1956) and Greece (1957) and later Turkey (1964). Belgium also began to look to recruiting migrant workers from North Africa from 1957 but the process was complicated by the ongoing Algerian War.

A guest worker agreement was signed with Morocco on 17 August 1964. This made Morocco the first North African state to make such an agreement with Belgium. In following years significant numbers of Moroccan workers, mainly single men, were recruited for work in Belgium. The program was cancelled in August 1974 amid the fall in demand created by the 1973–1975 recession and the country's escalating deindustrialisation. However, the spread of family reunification and high birth rates led to the rapid expansion of the community after the scheme's abolition. In following years, there was also immigration into Belgium from students and political dissidents opposed to the regime of King Hassan II.

Community
Moroccans form a major immigrant ethnic group in Belgium. The number of people with at least one parent born with Moroccan nationality was 430,000 on 1 January 2012, or about 4 percent of the national population. This proportion was 6.7% among those under 15 years of age. Belgium also represents one of the most important centres of the Moroccan diaspora. The Brussels-Capital Region has the most Moroccans in Belgium (45%), followed by Antwerp (22.7%), Liège (8.8%) and Charleroi (5.2%). 

A large majority of Moroccans in Belgium originate from northern Morocco (Al Hoceima, Nador, Tangier, Tetouan and Oujda).

It was reported in 2019 that six Moroccan-Belgians had been elected to the Chamber of Representatives and 21 in regional parliaments.

It was reported in 2020 that more than 1,500 Moroccan-Belgian dual nationals in Morocco had request repatriation to Belgium during the COVID-19 pandemic.

There is a small Moroccan Jewish community which runs the Judeo-Moroccan Cultural Centre (Centre de la Culture judéo-marocaine, CCJM) in Brussels. The chief Rabbi of Belgium is Albert Guigui, born in Meknès in 1944.

Radicalization 
In the 2012-2016 timespan, of the about 500 individuals who left the country to fight in the civil war in Syria, the great majority were of Moroccan descent according to U.S. and Belgian authorities. In a report by the Combating Terrorism Center, of the 135 individuals surveyed in connection with terrorism, there were 12 different nationalities. Of those 65% had Belgian citizenship and 33% were either Moroccan citizens or had ancestral roots there.

Notable people 

Zakia Khattabi
Rajae Maouane
Nahima Lanjri
Lubna Azabal
Zakaria Bakkali
Jamal Ben Saddik
Marouane Fellaini
Said Ouali
Michel Qissi
Hamza (rapper)

See also 

Arab Belgians
Islam in Belgium
Turks in Belgium

References

Further reading

External links 
 

Moroccans
 
Belgium–Morocco relations